The 1951–52 Drexel Dragons men's basketball team represented Drexel Institute of Technology during the 1951–52 men's basketball season. The Dragons, led by 3rd year head coach Harold Kollar, played their home games at Curtis Hall Gym, aside from 3 of their final 4 home games which were played at Sayre High School, and were members of the Southern division of the Middle Atlantic States Collegiate Athletic Conference (MASCAC).

In the 1951–52 season, Dan Promislo averaged 15.2 rebounds per game (288 in 19 games), settings a team record.

Roster

Schedule

|-
!colspan=9 style="background:#F8B800; color:#002663;"| Regular season
|-

References

Drexel Dragons men's basketball seasons
Drexel
1951 in sports in Pennsylvania
1952 in sports in Pennsylvania